Touro University Rainbow Health Coalition (RHC) is a group of students, faculty, and staff who promote health equity for lesbian, gay, bisexual, and transgender (LGBT) people at Touro University California.  The group was formally recognized by the Student Government of Touro in September 2002 as the Touro University Gay-Straight Alliance (TUGSA) and has been a University sanctioned club since that time, with the exception of 4 days in September of 2006. In 2012, the organization changed its name to the Rainbow Health Coalition. The new name was chosen to better convey the group's focus.

History 

In September 2006, the charter of the Touro University Gay-Straight Alliance was revoked by the administration of Touro University.  After 5 years of funding and recognition, the group was told their budget would be de-funded.  The school cited "inconsistencies between the group's mission and Jewish law.".

On September 11, 2006, students, faculty and staff of Touro University protested the revocation of the TUGSA charter.  They were joined by representatives from the American Medical Student Association, the Gay and Lesbian Medical Association and two members of the Vallejo City Council. In a letter written to Touro University dated September 11, 2006, Stephanie Gomes and Gary Cloutier of the Vallejo City Council stated "The fact that Touro has elected to deny the gay student group recognition under a publicly stated rationale that is transparently discriminatory and based on a tired cliché will make supporting future Touro initiatives highly problematic." The San Francisco Board of Supervisors adopted an agenda item urging Touro to reconsider its actions. Under pressure from the San Francisco Board of Supervisors, the Vallejo City Council, the Gay and Lesbian Medical Association, and the American Medical Student Association the school quickly reversed its decision and restored the group's funding.

After four days of protest, Touro University provost Harvey Kaye stated that the LGBT student group's charter had not been revoked.  In a letter to the Vallejo City Council dated September 11, 2006, he stated, "In my capacity as provost, I apologize on behalf of the university that this controversy has arisen, and trust that my letter will lay this matter to rest." In May 2008, Michael Harter, Ph.D., senior provost and CEO for Touro University said the executive team at the university never took any action to rescind funding for the gay-straight alliance and was not in agreement with the comments made by the university administrator at the student government meeting. 

This is the second major incidence of a Lesbian-Gay-Bisexual-Transgender student group being banned from a United States (U.S.) medical school.  The first occurred at New York Medical College (NYMC) in Valhalla, New York in Fall 2004.  The situation garnered national media attention in the U.S.  The Gay and Lesbian Medical Association and the American Medical Student Association spearheaded a campaign to raise awareness of the issue. NYMC came under an immense pressure from the Westchester County government, as well as other academic institutions with which it had affiliations, including Pace University Law School.  The Student Government association of NYMC, the faculty Senate, and the American Medical Student Association all also passed resolutions in support of the Gay and Lesbian student group. After a year of focused pressure, the school restored funding to the group.

References

External links 
 Gay-Lesbian Medical Association
 Touro College
 Official Touro University Gay Straight Alliance Website

LGBT political advocacy groups in California
LGBT youth organizations based in the United States
LGBT health organizations in the United States
LGBT student organizations
LGBT culture in the San Francisco Bay Area
2002 establishments in California
LGBT and Judaism
Vallejo, California
Organizations established in 2002
Medical and health organizations based in California
Touro University System
Mare Island